Vanitrochus padangensis is a species of sea snail, a marine gastropod mollusk in the family Trochidae, the top snails.

Description
The size of the shell varies between 2 mm and 3 mm.

Distribution
This marine shell occurs off the Western Sumatra.

References

 Thiele, J. (1925). Gastropoden der Deutschen Tiefsee-Expedition. II Teil. Wissenschaftliche Ergebnisse der Deutschen Tiefsee-Expedition auf dem Dampfer "Valdivia" 1898-1899. 17(2): 35-382, pls 13-46

External links
 

padangensis
Gastropods described in 1925